Juissi is a brand of juices and energy drinks belonging to the Finnish company Marli.

The different kind of juices under the Juissi-brand are the following: Pineapple-orange, Strawberry, Lemon-lime, Mixed (apple, green grape and raspberry), Fruit (grapefruit, pineapple, passion fruit, pear and apple), Pear, Blueberry-raspberry, Red Energy and Green Energy. All of them are sold in one liter cartons except for Mixed which can also be found in two liter cartons and Red and Green Energy which are sold in 0.75 liter cartons.

References
 Oy Marli Ab 

Juice brands
Finnish brands
Finnish drinks